Bow Glacier Falls is located near Banff, AB.  The falls originates from melt water from the Bow Glacier and flows into Bow Lake.

References

Waterfalls of Alberta